Wuxi Daily (Chinese: 无锡日报; Pinyin: Wúxī Rìbào) was established on Aug 1, 1949. It is owned by the Wuxi Municipal Government. Wuxi Daily was the first newspaper to be available online in Jiangsu.

About
Wuxi Daily is the mainstream media in Wuxi. The newspaper focuses on reporting economic, social and political events in the Greater Wuxi District, which includes Wuxi, Jiangyin, and Yixing.

Currently, the total circulation is above 600,000.

External links
 Official website of Wuxi Daily

Daily newspapers published in China
Chinese-language newspapers (Simplified Chinese)
Mass media in Wuxi
Publications established in 1949